What About Me? is the sixteenth studio album by Kenny Rogers, released by RCA Nashville in 1984. The album's title track, "What About Me?", is sung in trio with R&B singer James Ingram and Kim Carnes, which  reached number one on the AC charts and was also a pop and country hit, giving co-writer Richard Marx his first number one hit as a writer. Marx's second number one hit as a writer was the song "Crazy", which was included on the album.

Elsewhere on the album is "Two Hearts, One Love" by Byron Hill, are "Pickin' Up Strangers," released on Johnny Lee's Lookin' for Love album, and "The Stranger" (a story song in the vein of Rogers' previous hits such as "The Gambler" and "Lucille"), "The Night Goes On" (a R&B influenced ballad).

This album continued Rogers' long Platinum streak, quickly selling over a million copies.

Track listing

Personnel 
 Kenny Rogers – lead vocals, backing vocals 
 Erich Bulling – keyboards, synthesizer programming 
 Jimmy Cox – keyboards
 David Foster – keyboards, arrangements
 John Hobbs – keyboards
 Tom Keane – keyboards 
 Randy Kerber – keyboards
 Marcus Ryle – keyboards, synthesizer programming 
 Dann Huff – guitar
 Paul Jackson Jr. – guitar
 Michael Landau – guitar
 Fred Tackett – guitar
 Kin Vassy – guitar, backing vocals 
 Billy Joe Walker Jr. – guitar
 Dennis Belfield – bass
 Joe Chemay – bass
 Nathan East – bass
 Neil Stubenhaus – bass
 Ed Greene – drums
 John Robinson – drums
 Sheila E. – percussion
 Steve Forman – percussion
 Michael Temple – percussion
 Gary Herbig – saxophone
 Jeremy Lubbock – string arrangements and conductor (3, 5, 8)
 Kim Carnes – lead and backing vocals (1)
 James Ingram – lead and backing vocals (1)
 Kenny Cetera – backing vocals 
 Cindy Fee – backing vocals, lead vocals (5)
 Portia Griffin – backing vocals 
 Richard Marx – backing vocals 
 Herb Pedersen – backing vocals 
 Kenny Rogers II – backing vocals 
 Terry Williams – backing vocals

Production 
 Producers – Kenny Rogers (Tracks 1, 3-6, 9 & 10); David Foster (Tracks 1, 2, 7 & 8).
 Production Assistant – Debbie Caponetta
 Engineered and Mixed by Humberto Gatica 
 Additional Engineers – Mark Attel, Steve Crimmel, Reggie Dozier, Larry Ferguson, Tom Fouce, John Guess, Paul Lani, David Leonard, Laura Livingston, Steve Schmitt and Steve Shelton.
 Mastered by Wally Traugott at Capitol Mastering (Hollywood, California).
 A&R – Marge Meoli
 Art Direction – John Coulter
 Photography – Mario Casilli and Reid Miles
 Management – Ken Kragen

Charts

Weekly charts

Year-end charts

Further utilization
The song "The Night Goes On" was used as a love theme for the Eden Capwell and Cruz Castillo characters on the Santa Barbara TV series.

References

Kenny Rogers albums
1984 albums
Albums produced by David Foster
RCA Records albums